Bangkulu Island is an island in the Banda Sea. The island is part of the Banggai Islands and is administrated by the Banggai Islands Regency. The island is home to a population of the Banggai cardinalfish.

References 

Banggai Laut Regency
Landforms of Central Sulawesi
Islands of Sulawesi